The Odd Fellows Temple in Lexington, Kentucky, also known as Skullers Jewelry, Inc., was built in Second Empire and Italianate style between 1869–1870.  It was listed on the National Register of Historic Places in 1980.

References

National Register of Historic Places in Lexington, Kentucky
Second Empire architecture in Kentucky
Italianate architecture in Kentucky
Cultural infrastructure completed in 1870
Odd Fellows buildings in Kentucky
Clubhouses on the National Register of Historic Places in Kentucky
1870 establishments in Kentucky
Individually listed contributing properties to historic districts on the National Register in Kentucky